The Hiatus is a Japanese rock supergroup formed by Takeshi Hosomi, lead vocalist of Ellegarden.

Members
  – vocals, guitar (Ellegarden, MONOEYES)
 Masasucks – guitar (Fullscratch)
  – bass (Radio Caroline, ex-Thee Michelle Gun Elephant)
  – drums (Toe)
  – keyboard (Neil & Iraiza) - Left group in late 2012 to pursue his own album

Live support members
  – drums (Asparagus)
  – keyboard (Tokyo Jihen) - Became full-time keyboard player after Hirohisa Horie's departure

Visual artists
  – illustration
 Balcolony – art direction/design
  – CGI direction/motion graphics
  – music video director

Discography 
Albums
 Trash We'd Love (May 27, 2009)
 Anomaly (June 30, 2010)
 A World of Pandemonium (November 23, 2011)
 Keeper of the Flame (March 26, 2014)
 Hands of Gravity (July 6, 2016)
 Our Secret Spot (July 24, 2019)

EPs
 Insomnia (November 18, 2009)
 Hatching Mayflies (June 1, 2011)
 Horse Riding (July 31, 2013)

DVD
 The Hiatus Trash We'd Love Love Tour Final at Studio Coast (December 23, 2009)
 The Afterglow - A World of Pandemonium (September 12, 2012)
 The Afterglow Tour 2012 (March 22, 2013)
 Closing Night - Keeper of the Flame Tour 2014 - Nippon Budokan 2014.12.22 (June 24, 2015)

Live albums
 The Afterglow Tour 2012 (March 22, 2013)

See also
 Ellegarden
 Nothing's Carved in Stone

References

External links 
 Official website
 The Hiatus on Nayutawave Records
 Takeshi Hosomi's website
 Koji Ueno's website

Japanese alternative rock groups
Japanese progressive rock groups
Musical groups established in 2009
Universal Music Japan artists
English-language musical groups from Japan